Fairborn is a city in Greene County, Ohio, United States. The population was 34,620 at the 2020 census. Fairborn is a suburb of Dayton, and part of the Dayton Metropolitan Statistical Area.

It is the only city in the world named Fairborn, a portmanteau created from the names Fairfield and Osborn. After the Great Dayton Flood of 1913, the region and state created a conservation district here and, in the 1920s, began building Huffman Dam to control the Mad River. Residents of Osborn were moved with their houses to an area alongside Fairfield. In 1950, the two villages merged into the new city of Fairborn.

The city is home to Wright State University, which serves nearly 12,000 undergraduate and graduate students. The city also hosts the disaster training facility known informally as Calamityville.

History
Fairborn was formed from the union in 1950 of the two villages of Fairfield and Osborn. Fairfield was founded by European Americans in 1816 and Osborn in 1850.

The area of the village of Fairfield was settled by European Americans before Ohio was admitted as a state. The first log cabin was built in 1799 by George Greiner. Pioneers migrating northward and westward from Kentucky and Virginia considered this area near the Mad River desirable for settlement. They were encroaching on territory of the native Shawnee, who sometimes raided the village. Settlers retaliated. No massacres were recorded but both sides engaged in taking prisoners.

Two local accounts relate to the origin of the name "Fairfield". A local Native American chief, possibly a Shawnee, made peace and exchanged prisoners with leaders of the settlement. He said to William Cozad that, when he looked out from Reed's Hill over the town, 

The other possible source for the name is after a Fairfield in England.

Nearby Osborn was named after the superintendent of the railroad named E.F. Osborn. The settlement allowed the railroad to be built through it after the nearby town of Fairfield had refused such construction. Many of the original houses of old Osborn can be found in Fairborn's Historic Osborn District, where they were moved during the early 1920s.

From 1950–1970, the city grew to six times its former population, surpassing Xenia (the county seat) as the most populous city in the county, due largely to development and expansion of the nearby US Air Force Base. Southwestern Portland Cement, another major employer in the region, operated the largest factory in the city during this period, mining the locally exposed Brassfield Formation.

Until the mid-1960s, the city of Fairborn prohibited African Americans from living there and declared it was a sundown town. Officials at Wright-Patterson Air Force Base are credited with working with the city residents to end such policies, especially as the United States military was integrated beginning in 1948.

The development of Interstate 675 began in the 1960s to serve as an eastern bypass of Dayton. In the early 1970s, construction began on the northernmost part of I-675, just east of Fairborn. The first segment terminated at N. Fairfield Road (exit 17). No further construction was done for over a decade. This section was jokingly referred to by some as "Fairborn's private Interstate". Dayton Mayor James H. McGee opposed the highway, contending (accurately) that it would draw economic development out of the city into the suburbs, a pattern that took place in many other cities. I-675 was eventually completed by 1987.

Fairborn's growth slowed in the 1970s. It has resumed at a moderate pace since the late 1980s. It has since been surpassed by neighboring Beavercreek in population.

In 2007, many residents of Fairborn continue to work at nearby Wright-Patterson Air Force Base, the home of the Air Force Materiel Command. It has been described as the largest, most diverse and organizationally complex base in the Air Force.

Many also work at or attend Wright State University, a university that became independent in 1967. From a small cluster of buildings, it has grown into a major campus with almost 20,000 students. Though Wright State has a Dayton address, it is legally within Fairborn jurisdiction. Wright State University has its own Police officers, who are fully sworn through the State of Ohio.

Fairborn is the home of the largest elementary school in Ohio, Fairborn Primary School. Its students included children of military assigned to the Air Force base.

Fairborn hosts an annual Sweet Corn Festival every August and the USAF marathon every September. It also has an annual 4th of July Parade. The Fairborn Wee Hawks Pee Wee Football teams are based here.

Geography

Demographics

2010 census
As of the census of 2010, there were 32,770 people, 14,306 households, and 7,995 families residing in the city. The racial makeup of the city was 84.8% White, 7.7% African American, 0.3% Native American, 3.1% Asian, 0.1% Pacific Islander, 0.8% from other races, and 3.1% from two or more races. Hispanic or Latino people of any race were 2.4% of the population.

There were 14,306 households, of which 26.3% had children under the age of 18 living with them, 36.7% were married couples living together, 14.4% had a female householder with no husband present, 4.8% had a male householder with no wife present, and 44.1% were non-families. 32.7% of all households were made up of individuals, and 8.8% had someone living alone who was 65 years of age or older. The average household size was 2.24 and the average family size was 2.85.

The median age in the city was 32.4 years. 20.4% of residents were under the age of 18; 16.7% were between the ages of 18 and 24; 26.3% were from 25 to 44; 23.4% were from 45 to 64; and 13.2% were 65 years of age or older. The gender makeup of the city was 48.9% male and 51.1% female.

2000 census
As of the census of 2000, there were 32,052 people, 13,615 households, and 8,019 families residing in the city. The population density was 2,453.4 people per square mile (947.6/km2). There were 14,419 housing units at an average density of 1,103.7 per square mile (426.3/km2). The racial makeup of the city was 87.28% White, 6.27% African American, 0.40% Native American, 3.32% Asian, 0.06% Pacific Islander, 0.53% from other races, and 2.14% from two or more races. Hispanic or Latino people of any race were 1.69% of the population.

There were 13,615 households, out of which 26.7% had children under the age of 18 living with them, 42.8% were married couples living together, 12.4% had a female householder with no husband present, and 41.1% were non-families. 31.0% of all households were made up of individuals, and 8.3% had someone living alone who was 65 years of age or older. The average household size was 2.28 and the average family size was 2.86.

In the city the population was spread out, with 21.0% under the age of 18, 18.4% from 18 to 24, 29.3% from 25 to 44, 19.7% from 45 to 64, and 11.6% who were 65 years of age or older. The median age was 31 years. For every 100 females, there were 94.7 males. For every 100 females age 18 and over, there were 91.7 males.

The median income for a household in the city was $36,889, and the median income for a family was $44,608. Males had a median income of $34,853 versus $25,353 for females. The per capita income for the city was $18,662. About 8.9% of families and 14.2% of the population were below the poverty line, including 15.5% of those under age 18 and 7.7% of those age 65 or over.

Education
 Fairborn Primary School (formerly 5 Points Elementary School), grades pre-K-2
 Fairborn Intermediate School (formerly Palmer-South), grades 3–5
 Fairborn Baker Middle School (formerly Fairborn Baker High School), grades 6–8
 Fairborn High School (formerly Park Hills High School), grades 9–12
 Wright State University, a public university with over 19,000 students

Fairborn is served by a branch of the Greene County Public Library.

Notable people

 Brian Billick, head coach of the Baltimore Ravens, 1999–2007
 Roger B. Chaffee, astronaut who died in the Apollo 1 fire
 Kevin DeWine, Ohio Representative to the 70th district; Speaker Pro Tempore of the Ohio House of Representatives
 Gus Grissom, astronaut who died in the Apollo 1 fire
 J. D. Harmeyer, entertainment figure who appears on Howard Stern Show 
 Colonel Gregory H. Johnson, NASA astronaut
 Gary A. Klein, pioneer in the field of naturalistic decision 
 Martha Masters, classical guitarist
 Buddy Miller, roots musician, singer-songwriter, and producer, member of Emmylou Harris's Spyboy Band
 Roger Osborne, author
 Michael J. Saylor, founder of MicroStrategy
 Mark Turner, jazz saxophonist and teacher at the Manhattan School of Music
 Jackie (Waddell) Warner, actress in the reality television series Work Out

See also
Fairborn Daily Herald, local daily newspaper
Nutter Center
Mercer Log House

Notes

External links
City of Fairborn
 Fairborn Chamber of Commerce

 
Cities in Ohio
Cities in Greene County, Ohio
Populated places established in 1950
1950 establishments in Ohio
Sundown towns in Ohio